Qeshlaq-e Hajj Soleyman-e Ali Goshad Teymuri (also Romanized as Qeshlāq-e Ḩājj Soleymān-e ‘Alī Goshād Teymūrī; also known as Qeshlāq-e Soleymān-e ‘Alī Goshād) is a village in Qeshlaq-e Sharqi Rural District, Qeshlaq Dasht District, Bileh Savar County, Ardabil Province, Iran.

Population
At the 2006 census, its population was 43, in 10 families.

References 

Populated places in Bileh Savar County
Towns and villages in Bileh Savar County